The 2018 Athletics World Cup was held in London, United Kingdom, from 14 to 15 July 2018. This was the first and only edition of this competition.

Each team entered one athlete per event, and points were gained on the basis of finishing position. Although the majority of World championship events were contested, no races over 1500 metres were held, and no road events or multievents are on the program. The competition focused on an overall team prize, team prize money, The Platinum Trophy and Platinum team medals, but individual gold, silver and bronze medals were also awarded in each individual event.

While the event is organised outside of the official IAAF structures, the IAAF has expressed support for the event notwithstanding the existence of its own IAAF Continental Cup event.

The United States won the inaugural edition, finishing ahead of Poland, with Great Britain and Northern Ireland in third overall.

Participating nations
Participation was based on placings at the 2017 World Championships in Athletics in World Cup events (multi-events, and races longer than 1500m were therefore ignored).

The following eight nations competed in the 1st Athletics World Cup:

  China
  France
  Germany
  Great Britain and Northern Ireland
  Jamaica
  Poland
  South Africa
  United States

Event schedule and standings

Schedule

Final Standings

Medal table

Key
 Host nation (Great Britain)

Results summary

Detailed results

Men

100 metres
15 July

200 metres
14 July

400 metres
15 July

China withdrew from this event and were awarded 0 points.

800 metres
14 July

1500 metres
15 July

110 metres hurdles
14 July

400 metres hurdles
15 July

China withdrew from this event and were awarded 0 points.

4 × 100 metres relay
14 July

4 × 400 metres relay
15 July

China withdrew from this event and were awarded 0 points.

High jump
14 July

Pole vault
15 July

Long jump
15 July

Triple jump
14 July

Shot put
14 July

China withdrew from this event and were awarded 0 points.

Discus throw
14 July

China withdrew from this event and were awarded 0 points.

Hammer throw
15 July

China withdrew from this event and were awarded 0 points.

Javelin throw
15 July

China withdrew from this event and were awarded 0 points.

Women

100 metres
14 July

200 metres
15 July

400 metres
14 July

China withdrew from this event and were awarded 0 points.

800 metres
15 July

China withdrew from this event and were awarded 0 points.

1500 metres
14 July

China withdrew from this event and were awarded 0 points.

100 metres hurdles
15 July

400 metres hurdles
14 July

China withdrew from this event and were awarded 0 points.

4 × 100 metres relay
15 July

4 × 400 metres relay
14 July

China withdrew from this event and were awarded 0 points.

High jump
15 July

China withdrew from this event and were awarded 0 points.

Pole vault
14 July

Jamaica withdrew from the competition in this event. They received 0 points.
Sophie Cook of Great Britain was entered as a non-scoring athlete (i.e. she did not gain any points for Great Britain and Northern Ireland, though she was eligible for individual awards).

Long jump
14 July

Triple jump
15 July

China withdrew from this event and were awarded 0 points.

Shot put
15 July

Discus throw
15 July

Hammer throw
14 July

Javelin throw
14 July

References

External links
Home page

 
Athletics World Cup
World Cup
Athletics World Cup
Athletics World Cup
Athletics competitions in England
International sports competitions in London
Athletics World Cup